St. Lawrence—St. George was a federal electoral district in Montreal, Quebec, Canada, that was represented in the House of Commons of Canada from 1917 to 1968.

This riding was created in 1914 from parts of St. Antoine and St. Lawrence ridings. It was initially defined to consist of St. Lawrence and St. George Wards of the city of Montreal. After 1924, it was defined with reference to various streets of Montreal.

The electoral district was abolished in 1966 when it was redistributed into Saint-Henri, Saint-Jacques and Westmount ridings.

Members of Parliament

This riding elected the following Members of Parliament:

Election results

See also 

 List of Canadian federal electoral districts
 Past Canadian electoral districts

External links 
Riding history from the Library of Parliament:
 1914 - 1947
 1947 - 1952
 1952 - 1966

Former federal electoral districts of Quebec